Lola (originally released as Twinky and also known as London Affair) is a 1970 romantic comedy drama film directed by Richard Donner and starring Charles Bronson and Susan George.

Plot
A 38-year-old writer of pornographic novels named Scott (Charles Bronson) meets and falls in love with a sixteen-year-old school girl (Susan George) whilst living in London.

When Scott is refused a permanent visa to remain in Britain, the couple get married in Scotland and move to America where by state law Twinky must go to school. Tensions arise when Twinky wants to engage in teenage pastimes, while Scott struggles to complete his novels in order to earn a living. She runs away and is found by Scott in the cellar. Twinky then leaves for London the next day after writing Scott a tearful farewell letter.

Cast

Production
The idea and script for the film was written by Norman Thaddeus Vane, which author Simon Richter believes was the key force behind the film. Vane's script has been suggested to be somewhat autobiographical, as it mirrors the author's own marriage to 16 year-old model Sarah Caldwell, whom he married in the mid-1960s when he was 38.

Music
The title song and two other original numbers are composed and performed by Jim Dale.

Release

Theatrical
The film had its world premiere at the Metropole Victoria in London on 15 January 1970. It opened in London on 15 February 1970.

Critical response
The Contemporary North American Film Directors: A Wallflower Critical Guide state that the film exploited "the sexual freedom of its era", describing Susan George's character as a "naive young nymphet".

References

External links
 

1969 films
1969 comedy films
British comedy films
Italian comedy films
Films about writers
Films directed by Richard Donner
Films scored by John Scott (composer)
Films set in London
1970s English-language films
1960s English-language films
1960s British films
1970s British films
1960s Italian films
1970s Italian films